The 1969–70 Algerian Championnat National was the eighth season of the Algerian Championnat National since its establishment in 1962. A total of 16 teams contested the league, with CR Belcourt as the defending champions, The Championnat started on october 5, 1969. and ended on May 10, 1970.

Team summaries

Promotion and relegation 
Teams promoted from Algerian Division 2 1969-1970 
 CS Constantine
 JSM Tiaret

Teams relegated to Algerian Division 2 1970-1971
 JS Djijel
 USM Annaba

League table

Season statistics

Top scorers

References

External links
1969–70 Algerian Championnat National

Algerian Ligue Professionnelle 1 seasons
1969–70 in Algerian football
Algeria